Pater Patriae (plural Patres Patriae), also seen as Parens Patriae, is a Latin honorific meaning "Father of the Country", or more literally, "Father of the Fatherland".

It is also used for President of the United States George Washington, the Swedish King Gustav I, Prince Willem of Orange and the four authors of Italian unification Camillo Cavour, Giuseppe Garibaldi, Giuseppe Mazzini and King Victor Emmanuel II.

Roman history 
The honor of being called pater patriae was conferred by the Roman Senate.

It was first awarded to Roman general Marcus Furius Camillus in 386 BC, who for his role in the aftermath of the Gallic siege of Rome was considered a second founder of the city, in succession to Romulus.

Three centuries later, it was awarded to the orator and statesman Marcus Tullius Cicero for his part in the suppression of the Catilinarian conspiracy during his consulate in 63 BC.

It was next awarded to Julius Caesar, who as dictator became the de facto ruler of the Roman Republic and its imperium, for having ended the civil wars.

The Senate voted the title to Augustus in 2 BC, but being neither important for the ruler's legitimacy nor for his legal powers, it did not become a regular part of the imperial honors, contrary to Imperator, Caesar, Augustus, princeps senatus, pontifex maximus and tribunicia potestas. According to the historian Suetonius, Augustus' successor, Tiberius, was offered this title, but refused it.

The Senate eventually conferred the title on many Roman emperors, often only after many years of rule, or if the new emperor was particularly esteemed by the senators, as in the case of Nerva. As a result, many of the short-lived Emperors never received the title.

The honor was subject to the approval of the honored, who could decline it. Tiberius did so and Nero did so when first offered the honor during the first year of his reign, on account of his youth, though he later accepted when the honor was conferred on him for a second time. It was traditional for the honored, in a proper sign of humility, to defer the honor for some time once conferred. Hadrian deferred for eleven years, for example.

Chronological list of Patres Patriae 

 Romulus, 753 BC (as the legendary founder of Rome)
 Marcus Furius Camillus, 386 BC (for his role in the aftermath of the Gallic siege of Rome)
 Marcus Tullius Cicero, 63 BC (for his role in the suppression of the Catilinarian conspiracy)
 Gaius Julius Caesar, 45 BC (for having restored the Pax Romana in the 40s BC after the civil wars)
 Augustus, February 5, 2 BC
 Caligula, 37
 Claudius, January, 42
 Nero, 55
 Vespasian, 70
 Titus, June, 79
 Domitian, September 14, 81
 Nerva, September, 96
 Trajan, 98
 Hadrian, 128
 Antoninus Pius, 139
 Marcus Aurelius and Lucius Verus, 166
 Commodus, 177
 Septimius Severus, 193
 Caracalla, 199
 Macrinus, June, 217
 Elagabalus, July, 218
 Gordian III, May, 238
 Probus, July, 276
 Diocletian, November 20, 284
 Maximian, April 1, 286
 Constantine I, 307
Julian, 361

See also 
 Founding Fathers
 Victory title
 Father of the Nation
 Atatürk

Notes

References 

Ancient Roman titles
Honorifics
Latin words and phrases
Military awards and decorations of ancient Rome